Penicillaria maculata is a moth of the family Euteliidae first described by Arthur Gardiner Butler in 1889. It is found throughout the Indo-Australian tropics, Vanuatu and New Caledonia.

References

Moths described in 1889
Euteliinae
Moths of Japan